The Nicholas School of the Environment is one of ten graduate and professional schools at Duke University and is headquartered on Duke’s main campus in Durham, N.C. A secondary coastal facility, Duke University Marine Laboratory, is maintained in Beaufort, North Carolina. The Nicholas School is composed of three research divisions: Earth and Climate Sciences, Environmental Sciences and Policy, and Marine Science and Conservation. The current dean of the Nicholas School is Toddi Steelman.

History
The Nicholas School celebrates its creation date as 1991, but it represents a coming together of three entities that are almost as old as the university itself. Both formed in 1938, the School of Forestry and Environmental Studies and the Duke University Marine Laboratory came together in 1991 to become the School of Environment. Following a $20 million gift from Peter M. and Ginny Nicholas in 1995, the school was named the Nicholas School of the Environment. In 1997, the Department of Geology (formed in 1936) joined the school as the Division of Earth and Climate Sciences and focuses on a number of areas at the intersection of earth and environmental sciences.

School facilities and technology
The school is headquartered in Grainger Hall, a 70,000-square-foot, five-story glass-and-concrete building, located on Circuit Drive on Duke’s West Campus that incorporates green features and technologies inside and out. It has been designed to meet or exceed the criteria for LEED Green Building platinum certification, the highest level of sustainability. Duke University’s Grainger Hall Received LEED Platinum Certification on October 26, 2015.

The hall houses five classrooms, a 105-seat auditorium, 45 private offices, 72 open office spaces, a 32-seat computer lab, an outdoor courtyard and an environmental art gallery, as well as conference rooms, shared workrooms and common.

Green features range from rooftop solar panels and innovative climate control and water systems, to special windows that moderate light and heat, to an organic orchard and sustainably designed landscaping.
The building sits in front of the A Wing of Levine Science Research Center (LSRC) its former home.  That wing of the LSRC is currently undergoing renovations to house laboratories and student services oriented offices. The Division of Earth and Climate Sciences occupies renovated laboratories in the Old Chemistry building on the West Campus with plans to relocate to new space in LSRC and Grainger Hall sometime in 2019. The division maintains facilities for geochemical analysis and climate modeling studies.

The School also holds classes in the Old Chemistry building as well as in Gross Hall. Also inside Gross Hall is the Duke University Energy Initiative.

The Duke University Marine Laboratory is home to the third division of the school, the Marine Science and Conservation division situated on Pivers Island in Beaufort, North Carolina. The current Director of the Marine Laboratory is Andrew J Read. In addition, the Nicholas School uses the Duke Forest, established in 1931 and spanning 7,060 acres, for teaching and research purposes.

Degree programs
As of 2018, the Nicholas School provides educational opportunities for students at the doctoral level (Ph.D.), graduate professional level (Master of Environmental Management and Master of Forestry), and undergraduate level (B.S. and A.B.).

Doctoral Programs: Earth and Climate Science, Environment, Marine Science & Conservation, University Program in Ecology, University Program in Environmental Health and Toxicology, University Program in Environmental Policy

Master's Programs: Master of Environmental Management, Master of Forestry, Duke Environmental Leadership - Master of Environmental Management

Master's Programs: International Master of Environmental Policy at Duke Kunshan University

Undergraduate Programs: Earth & Climate Sciences, Environmental Sciences | Environmental Sciences & Policy Programs, Marine Science & Conservation

Joint degree programs with Duke University School of Law, Fuqua School of Business, and Sanford School of Public Policy are also available to enrolled students at the Nicholas School. Other concurrent degree programs include the Master of Arts in Teaching (MA) administered through the Graduate School of Duke University, Master of Engineering Management Program (MEMP) at the Pratt School of Engineering, and selected graduate degrees offered at the University of North Carolina at Chapel Hill.

Notable people

Faculty
William L. Chameides (former Dean)
Jay Golden
Orrin Pilkey
Stuart Pimm
Lincoln Pratson
William H. Schlesinger (former Dean)
Drew Shindell
Cindy Lee Van Dover
Erika Weinthal

References

External links
 

Duke University
Educational institutions established in 1938
Duke University campus
1938 establishments in North Carolina